is a 2020 Japanese drama film directed by Miwa Nishikawa. The film premiered at the 2020 Toronto International Film Festival.

Plot
Mikami, a middle-aged former yakuza who has spent most of his life in prison, is released after serving 13 years for murder. Hoping to find his long-lost mother, from whom he was separated as a child, he applies to a TV show and meets young TV director Tsunoda. Meanwhile, Mikami struggles to get a proper job and fit in society. His impulsive, adamant nature and ingrained beliefs cause friction in his relationship with Tsunoda and those who want to help him. (cited from Aoi Pro)

Cast
 Kōji Yakusho as Masao Mikami
 Taiga Nakano as Ryūtarō Tsunoda
 Seiji Rokkaku as Ryōsuke Matsumoto
 Yukiya Kitamura as Hisatoshi Iguchi
 Hakuryu as Akimasa Shimoinaba
 Midoriko Kimura as Masuko Shimoinaba
 Shūhei Takahashi
 Maho Yamada
 Rina Sakuragi as Lily-san
 Yōhei Matsukado
 Tamaki Shiratori
 Eita Okuno
 Takumi Matsuzawa
 Masami Nagasawa as Haruka Yoshizawa
 Narumi Yasuda as Kumiko Nishio
 Meiko Kaji as Atsuko Shōji
 Isao Hashizume as Tsutomu Shōji

Awards

Reception

Under the Open Sky grossed $4,722,021 at the box office.

References

External links

2020 films
2020s Japanese films
2020 drama films
Japanese drama films
2020s Japanese-language films
Films directed by Miwa Nishikawa
Films based on Japanese novels
Warner Bros. films
Yakuza films